Zoltán Búrány (Zoltan Buranj; born 26 July 1989) is a Hungarian football player who play for Taksony SE.

External links

 Profile at HLSZ
 
 

1989 births
Living people
Sportspeople from Subotica
Hungarians in Vojvodina
Serbian emigrants to Hungary
Hungarian footballers
Association football midfielders
Tisza Volán SC footballers
Diósgyőri VTK players
Szolnoki MÁV FC footballers
Szombathelyi Haladás footballers
Mezőkövesdi SE footballers
SZEOL SC players
Vác FC players
Nemzeti Bajnokság I players
Nemzeti Bajnokság II players